is a former Japanese swimmer who competed in the 1988 Summer Olympics.

References

1969 births
Living people
Japanese male breaststroke swimmers
Olympic swimmers of Japan
Swimmers at the 1988 Summer Olympics